Clarivate Plc is a British-American publicly traded analytics company that operates a collection of subscription-based services, in the areas of bibliometrics and scientometrics; business / market intelligence, and competitive profiling for pharmacy and biotech, patents, and regulatory compliance; trademark protection, and domain and brand protection. In the academy and the scientific community, Clarivate is known for being the company which calculates the impact factor, using data from its Web of Science product family, that also includes services/applications such as Publons, EndNote, EndNote Click, and ScholarOne. Its other product families are Cortellis, DRG, CPA Global, Derwent, MarkMonitor, CompuMark, and Darts-ip,  and also the various ProQuest products and services.

Clarivate was formed in 2016, following the acquisition of Thomson Reuters' Intellectual Property and Science Business by Onex Corporation and Baring Private Equity Asia.  Clarivate has been growing fast by numerous acquisitions: in the 5 years since its incorporation Clarivate bought over a dozen companies in the information service industry (see below). Despite raising anti-monopoly concerns, in some cases Clarivate acquired companies that were direct competitors of each other. Perhaps the most notable example of this was the purchase of ProQuest for $5.3 billion in December 2021, that was a competitor of the Web of Science (owned by Clarivate since 2017).

Company history 

Clarivate (formerly Clarivate Analytics) was formerly the Intellectual Property and Science division of Thomson Reuters. Before 2008, it was known as Thomson Scientific. In 2016, Thomson Reuters struck a $3.55 billion deal in which they spun it off as an independent company, and sold it to private-equity firms Onex Corporation and Baring Private Equity Asia.

In May 2019, Clarivate merged with the Churchill Capital Corp SPAC to obtain a public listing on the New York Stock Exchange (NYSE) It currently trades with symbol NYSE:CLVT.

After the 2022 Russian invasion of Ukraine, on March 11, 2022, Clarivate, that has an office in Odessa, Ukraine announced that it would cease all commercial activity in Russia.

Operations 
Clarivate reported its gross profit margin as  64% (in 2019)  and its EBIDTA profit margin as 45% (in 2021), which places it in the range of entertainment software and tobacco industries, and ahead of pharmaceutical, oil/gas and cell phone industries. Clarivate has been criticized for its anti-competitive practices in a highly oligopolistic academic database market, for increasing the prices of the products it acquired, for the lack of further development and integration of the acquired products, for not developing its own products, for outsourcing jobs from the USA and UK to India, and for eliminating telephone support for many of the acquired products.

Leadership Changes  
On July 11, 2022, Clarivate announced that Jerre Stead would retire from his role as Executive Chair and Chief Executive Officer to become Non-Executive Chair of the Board of Directors on September 1, 2022. Jonathan Gear, previously Chief Financial Officer of IHS Markit, joined Clarivate on July 11, 2022, as CEO-elect, and became Chief Executive Officer on September 1, 2022.  

On September 1, 2022, Clarivate announced that Jerre Stead would retire from the Board on October 20, 2022, at which date Andrew Snyder, CEO of Cambridge Information Group and Vice Chairman of Clarivate, becomes the new Chair effective from that date. The Board has appointed Mr. Stead as Chairman Emeritus upon his Board retirement.

Acquisitions 
 June 1, 2017: Publons, a platform for researchers to share recognition for peer review.
 April 10, 2018: Kopernio, AI-tech startup providing ability to search for full-text versions of selected scientific journal articles.
 October 30, 2018: TrademarkVision, provider of Artificial Intelligence (AI) trademark research applications.
 September 9, 2019: SequenceBase, provider of patent sequence information and search technology to the biotech, pharmaceutical and chemical industries.
 December 2, 2019: Darts-ip, provider of case law data and analytics for intellectual property (IP) professionals.
 January 17, 2020: Decision Resources Group (DRG), a leading healthcare research and consulting company, providing high-value healthcare industry analysis and insights.
 June 22, 2020: CustomersFirst Now, in intellectual property (“IP”) software and tech-enabled services.
 October 1, 2020: CPA Global, intellectual property (“IP”) software and tech-enabled services.
 December 1, 2021: ProQuest, software, data and analytics provider to academic, research and national institutions. It was acquired for $5.3 billion from Cambridge Information Group in what was described as a "huge deal in the library and information publishing world". The company said that the operational concept behind the acquisition was integrating ProQuest's products and applications with Web of Science. Chairman of ProQuest Andy Snyder became the vice chairman of Clarivate. The Scholarly Publishing and Academic Resources Coalition, an advocacy group for open access to scholarship, voiced antitrust concerns. The acquisition had been delayed mid-year due to a Federal Trade Commission antitrust probe.

Divestments
 November 2020: Clarivate sold its Techstreet division to a for-profit subsidiary of the American Society of Mechanical Engineers.
 November 2022: Clarivate divested MarkMonitor, which provides domain management, brand protection, anti-piracy, and anti-fraud services, to Newfold Digital.

Products and services

Web of Science

ProQuest 
As Clarivate acquired ProQuest, various products of ProQuest are being operated under Clarivate, which encompasses products that ProQuest had taken on relatively recently, through acquisitions of its own—notably those of Innovative Interfaces: Vega, Sierra, Polaris, Millennium, and Virtua.

Cortellis 
Cortellis comprises life science-related intelligence services used to inform decision making across the drug and device development lifecycle, including:
 Cortellis Regulatory Intelligence
 Cortellis Competitive Intelligence
 Cortellis Clinical Trials Intelligence
 Cortellis Deals Intelligence
 Cortellis Drug Discovery Intelligence
 Cortellis Digital Health Intelligence
 MetaCore
 Cortellis Generics Intelligence (formerly Newport)
 Chemistry, Manufacturing and Controls (CMC) Intelligence
 BioWorld

Derwent 

Other database products and services used for searching and analyzing patents; IP administration and prosecution support services to support the IP lifecycle include:
 Derwent Innovation
 Derwent SequenceBase
 Derwent Data Analyzer
 GENESEQ

CompuMark 
Information services used by brand and trademark professionals to evaluate new potential trademarks and monitor existing trademarks for infringement, including:
 SAEGIS®, online trademark screening
 TM go365, self-service trademark research application
 Full Search, analyst driven trademark searching
 Watching, trademark protection

ScholarOne 

ScholarOne is a submission management system to allow an editor of an academic journal to manage electronic submission of authors' manuscripts for publication, to recruit reviewers of those manuscripts, to check authors' compliance with the journal's requirements, and to communicate with authors.

Annual lists and reports

Highly Cited Researchers 
Clarivate publishes an annual Highly Cited Researchers list. The list compiles "the world's most influential researchers of the past decade, demonstrated by the production of multiple highly-cited papers that rank in the top 1% by citations for field and year in Web of Science." According to Clarivate, researchers are selected for their "exceptional performance" in one or more of 21 fields (those used in Clarivate Essential Science Indicators, or ESI) or across several fields. The 2019 list of Highly Cited Researchers was released on November 19, 2019.

Clarivate Citation Laureates 

From 2002 to 2020, 59 individuals listed as Citation Laureates have received Nobel prizes.

Journal Citation Reports

Top 100 Global Innovators Report 
The annual Top 100 Global Innovators report identifies the world's most innovative organizations. These businesses have successfully developed valuable patented inventions that also have strong commercialization potential based on market reach and impact on other downstream inventions. The 2020 Top 100 Global Innovators Report was released on February 19, 2020.

See also
 List of academic databases and search engines
 Truven Health Analytics, another analytics company spun off from the Science and Healthcare unit of Thomson Reuters, later acquired by IBM
 RELX, a company that operates Scopus, which competes with WoS

References

External links 

Analytics companies
Bibliometrics organisations
Technology companies established in 2018
2018 establishments in the United States
Companies based in Philadelphia
Private equity portfolio companies
 
Special-purpose acquisition companies